Woodsville Brook is a tributary of the Stony Brook in Mercer County, New Jersey in the United States.

Course
It flows northeast, crossing New Road and Marshalls Corner Woodsville Road.

Sister tributaries
Baldwins Creek
Duck Pond Run
Honey Branch
Lewis Brook
Peters Brook
Stony Brook Branch

See also
List of rivers of New Jersey

References

External links
USGS Coordinates in Google Maps

Rivers of Mercer County, New Jersey
Tributaries of the Raritan River
Rivers of New Jersey